First Presbyterian Church Manse or First Presbyterian Church and Manse may refer to:
(sorted by state, then city/town)

First Presbyterian Church Manse (North Little Rock, Arkansas), listed on the National Register of Historic Places (NRHP) in Pulaski County, Arkansas
First Presbyterian Church and Manse (Baltimore, Maryland), listed on the NRHP in Baltimore, Maryland
First Presbyterian Church and Manse (Forsyth, Montana), listed on the NRHP in Rosebud County, Montana
First Presbyterian Church Manse (Clarksville, Tennessee), listed on the NRHP in Montgomery County, Tennessee

See also
First Presbyterian Manse (Niagara Falls, New York), listed on the National Register of Historic Places (NRHP) in Niagara County, New York